Ras-related protein Rab-8A is a protein that in humans is encoded by the RAB8A gene.

Function 

The protein encoded by this gene is a member of the RAS superfamily which are small GTP/GDP-binding proteins with an average size of 200 amino acids. The RAS-related proteins of the RAB/YPT family may play a role in the transport of proteins from the endoplasmic reticulum to the Golgi and the plasma membrane. This protein shares 97%, 96%, and 51% similarity with the dog RAB8, mouse MEL, and mouse YPT1 proteins, respectively and contains the 4 GTP/GDP-binding sites that are present in all the RAS proteins. The putative effector-binding site of this protein is similar to that of the RAB/YPT proteins. However, this protein contains a C-terminal CAAX motif that is characteristic of many RAS superfamily members but which is not found in YPT1 and the majority of RAB proteins. Although this gene was isolated as a transforming gene from a melanoma cell line, no linkage between MEL and malignant melanoma has been demonstrated. This oncogene is located 800 kb distal to MY09B on chromosome 19p13.1.

Interactions 

RAB8A has been shown to interact with Optineurin and MAP4K2.

References

Further reading